Lord of the Jungle may refer to:

 Lord of the Jungle (film), a 1955 American film in the Bomba, the Jungle Boy series
 Lord of the Jungle (Dynamite), a Dynamite Entertainment comic book based on public domain Tarzan novels
 Tarzan, Lord of the Jungle (novel), a Tarzan novel by Edgar Rice Burroughs
 Tarzan, Lord of the Jungle, a Saturday morning cartoon by Filmation